I Am the King of Amapiano: Sweet & Dust is a third solo studio album by South African DJ Kabza De Small, released through Piano Hub on June 26, 2020.

Critical reception 

I Am the King of Amapiano: Sweet & Dust received generally positive reviews from music critics.

The Native Mag wrote; "I Am the King of Amapiano: Sweet & Dust is a terrific front-to-back album that serves as a resounding statement of Kabza’s undeniable powers, and it immediately stands as a creative milestone for the entire subgenre".

Commercial performance 
Up its release I Am the King of Amapiano: Sweet & Dust debuted on Apple's Top 30 Album and suprassed over 8 million streams.

The album peaked at number one on Spotify's Most streamed South African albums in South Africa.

Industry awards 

!
|-
|rowspan="3"|2021
|rowspan="3"|I Am the King of Amapiano: Sweet & Dust
|Album of the Year 
|
|rowspan="3"|
|-
|Best Amapiano Album
|
|-
|Male Artist of the Year	
|

Music 
The standard edition of I Am the King of Amapiano: Sweet & Dust is about a three-hour and fifth seven minutes long, consisting of 27 tracks.

Track listing

Personnel 
All credits adapted from AllMusic.
 Kopzz Avenue - Featured Artist
 Ayodeji Balogun - Composer
 Austin Kulani Baloyi - Composer
 Bongza - Featured Artist
 Buckz - Featured Artist
 Burna Boy - Featured Artist
 Nicole Tafadzwa Chigariro - Composer 
 Kabza De Small - Primary Artist
 Nicole Elocin - Featured Artist
 Focalistic - Featured Artist
 Howard Gomba - Composer
 Earl Green - Featured Artist
 Howard - Featured Artist
 Tyler ICU - Featured Artist
 Leehleza -Featured Artist
 George Lesley - Composer, Featured Artist
 Peleka Lwana - Composer
 Madumane - Featured Artist
 William Makume - Composer
 Mduduzi Keith Mangena - Composer
 Charmaine Mapimbiro - Composer
 DaliWonga Matiwane - Composer
 Samkelo Lelethu Mdolomba - Composer, Featured Artist
 Lindokuhle Mgedezi - Composer
 Vyno Miller - Featured Artist
 Bongani Mlotshwa - Composer
 Kelvin Momo - Featured Artist
 Kabelo Motha - Composer
 Cassper Nyovest - Featured Artist
 Damini Ogulu - Composer
 Nia Pearl - Composer, Featured Artist
 Refiloe Maele Phoolo - Composer
 Obakeng Ramahali - Composer
 Kopano Ramothata - Composer
 Lethabo Sebetso - Composer
 Themba Sekowe - Composer
 Sha Sha - Featured Artist
 Bongani Sikhukhula - Composer
 Xolani Skhosana - Composer
 Bontle Smith - Composer, Featured Artist
 Lindelihle Gladwell Sukazi - Composer
 MDU aka TRP - Featured Artist
 Mlindo the Vocalist - Featured Artist
Wizkid - Featured Artist
 DaliWonga - Featured Artist
 Xolaniguitars - Featured Artist

References 

2020 albums
Amapiano albums